was a Japanese skier. He was a skiing teacher and photographer of mountain landscapes. He was notable for his fitness and outdoor-sport undertakings at advanced age; at 77 he was the oldest person to climb Kilimanjaro and at 99 descended a Gletscher of Mont Blanc together with his oldest son Yuichiro and grandson Yuta. Yuichiro Miura was also the oldest person to climb Mount Everest and the Himalayas, at age 70, at age 75 and later at age 80. Keizo Miura wrote two books on his health routine, one of them co-written with his physician. On February 15, 2004, Keizo Miura celebrated his hundredth birthday with a ski descent together with more than 170 friends and family members, including four generations of his family, at Snowbird ski resort in Salt Lake City, Utah, United States. Keizo died 41 days short of his 102nd birthday.

References

Japanese mountain climbers
Japanese centenarians
Men centenarians
People from Aomori (city)
1904 births
2006 deaths
Hokkaido University alumni